Caledothele is a genus of South Pacific spiders in the family Euagridae. It was first described by Robert Raven in 1991.

Species
 it contains seven species:
Caledothele annulatus (Raven, 1981) – New Caledonia, Loyalty Is.
Caledothele aoupinie Raven, 1991 – New Caledonia
Caledothele australiensis (Raven, 1984) (type) – Australia (Victoria)
Caledothele carina Raven, 1991 – New Caledonia
Caledothele elegans Raven, 1991 – New Caledonia
Caledothele tonta Raven, 1991 – New Caledonia
Caledothele tristata Raven, 1991 – New Caledonia

References

External links

Euagridae
Mygalomorphae genera
Spiders of Australia